The 2006–07 Lithuanian Hockey League season was the 16th season of the Lithuanian Hockey League, the top level of ice hockey in Lithuania. Four teams participated in the league, and SC Energija won the championship. SC Energija received a bye until the finals, as they played in the Latvian Hockey League. Maximum Vilnius qualified for the final round (Group A) by virtue of winning Group B.

Group B

Group A

Final
 SC Energija - SC Energija II 6:4

External links
Lithuanian Ice Hockey Federation official website

Lithuanian Hockey League
Lithuania Hockey League seasons
Lith